Norway was represented by Sverre Kjelsberg and Mattis Hætta, with the song "Sámiid ædnan", at the 1980 Eurovision Song Contest, which took place on 19 April in The Hague. "Sámiid ædnan" was chosen as the Norwegian entry at the Melodi Grand Prix on 22 March and remains one of the best-remembered Norwegian entries, particularly in Norway itself.

The song’s chorus, consisting of traditional Sami yoik song, was first performed publicly by Mattis Hætta and was broadcast on NRK in October 1979, in connection with the hunger strike song by Sami activists in front of the Norwegian parliament building in connection with the Alta controversy. The verse of the song also refers to this with the line "framførr tinget der dem satt, hørtes joiken dag og natt" (in front of the parliament where they sat, the yoik was heard day and night). Only Kjelsberg was credited as composer of the entry, although Hætta wrote the chorus.

Before Eurovision

Melodi Grand Prix 1980 
The Melodi Grand Prix 1980 was held at the studios of broadcaster NRK in Oslo, hosted by Norway's 1966 representative Åse Kleveland. The Orchestra was Conducted by Egil Monn-Inversen. Ten songs took part in the final, with the winner chosen by a 9-member jury who awarded 10 points to their favourite song down to 1 point to the least-liked. Voting was very close with only 4 points separating the top five songs. The first vote resulted in a tie for first place, so each jury member was asked to nominate their preferred song of the two, and "Sámiid ædnan" won by 5 votes to 4.

At Eurovision 
On the night of the final Kjelsberg and Hætta performed 11th in the running order, following Finland and preceding Germany. The song was very unusual for Eurovision both structurally and thematically, and the stage presentation, although simple and gimmick-free, proved very memorable to viewers and frequently features in Eurovision montages. At the close of voting "Sámiid ædnan" had received 15 points, placing Norway 16th of the 19 entries. The Norwegian jury awarded its 12 points to contest winners Ireland.

Voting

References

External links 
Full national final on nrk.no

1980
Countries in the Eurovision Song Contest 1980
1980
Eurovision
Eurovision